There's Alway's Tomorrow may refer to:

Film and television
There's Always Tomorrow (1934 film), based on Ursula Parrott's novel; directed by Edward Sloman, starring Frank Morgan, Binnie Barnes and Lois Wilson
There's Always Tomorrow (1956 film), second filming of Parrott's novel; directed by Douglas Sirk, starring Barbara Stanwyck, Fred MacMurray and Joan Bennett
There's Always Tomorrow (telenovela) (original title: Siempre habrá un mañana), 1974 Mexican serial
There's Always Tomorrow, 1980 Malaysian film (original title: Esok Masih Ada) (see List of Malaysian films of the 1980s)
There's Always Tomorrow (original title Ashita-ga arusa), 2001 Japanese film based on 1963 song, starring Takashi Fujii 
There's Always Tomorrow (2001 TV series) (original title Ashita-ga arusa), Japanese drama based on 1963 song, starring Takashi Fujii 
"There's Always Tomorrow, Baby", episode of Japanese anime television series Space Dandy (see List of Space Dandy episodes)

Literature
There's Always Tomorrow, 1929 novel by American Ursula Parrott; basis for 1934 and 1956 films
There’s Always Tomorrow: The story of a checkered life, 1935 memoir by American reporter, spy, and film maker Marguerite Harrison
There’s Always Tomorrow, 1974 autobiography by English actress Anna Neagle

Music
"There's Always Tomorrow" (Hachidai Nakamura and Yukio Aoshima song), performed in 1963 by Kyu Sakamoto
"There's Always Tomorrow", by Johnny Marks, part of score for 1964 TV special Rudolph the Red-Nosed Reindeer (soundtrack)
"There's Always Tomorrow", on Paul Revere & the Raiders' 1966 Midnight Ride (album)
"There's Always Tomorrow", on Red Red Meat's 1995 album, Bunny Gets Paid
"There's Always Tomorrow", from George Stiles and Anthony Drewe's score for 1996 musical Peter Pan: A Musical Adventure
"There's Always Tomorrow", by Space Twins' 2003 album The End of Imagining
"There's Always Tomorrow", on 2005's Passion (Geri Halliwell album)
"There's Always Tomorrow", on Ulrich Schnauss' and Mark Peters' 2013 Tomorrow Is Another Day (album)

Other uses
There's Always Tomorrow, 1949 English play, with original cast including Hugh Paddick
"There's Always Tomorrow", radio spy drama by Ted Allbeury; broadcast in 1985 and included in 1990 short story collection Other Kinds of Treason